The Sig River, also known as Mekerra, is a river of Algeria.

The Sig River is a tributary of the Chelif River and flows through the town of Sig.
 The river is a wadi.

The area is characterized by a rough winter compared to other regions in Algeria, and a fairly warm summer.

References

Rivers of Algeria
Bodies of water of Algeria
Landforms of Algeria